The Kori Creek is a tidal creek in the Kutch region of the Indian state of Gujarat. It lies just to the west of the Great Rann of Kutch area of India. This region belonging to India is a part of the Indus River Delta, which lies across Gujarat state in India and Sindh in Pakistan.

The Sir Creek, laying around 33 km northwest of Kori Creek, is a disputed area between India and Pakistan.

Geography 
On the border of India and Pakistan in Gujarat at the mouth of the Indus River, the Kori Creek is one of the six main creeks on the Indian side. All other five are to the west of it, namely Sir Creek – the westernmost creek, Vian Wari Creek (Vianbari and Viyanbari), Pir Sanai, Pabevari, and Padala 16 km west. All of these creeks are within undisputed territory of India, except for the westernmost creek, namely the Sir Creek, which is claimed by both India and Pakistan. Ever shifting creeks exit Indian territory, enter Pakistan, reenter India and vice versa, thus creating a hard-to-patrol snake- and scorpion-infested marshy wetland border with no physical barrier or fencing. The Indian military's Border Security Force (BSF) patrols the Kori Creek and Sir Creek up to the midstream using floating border posts, amphibious vehicles, and foot travel by the Creek Crocodile Commandos. The coastal area of the Sir Creek is manned by the Indian Coast Guard, and the larger open sea beyond is patrolled by the Indian Navy.

See also
 Rann of Kutch
 Borders of India

References

Estuaries of India
Landforms of Gujarat
Geography of Kutch district